Jonathan Watton is a Canadian actor. He is best known for playing the role of Darcy Garland in Murdoch Mysteries. He has a recurring role in The Handmaid's Tale as Matthew Calhoun. He also directed the short films Last of the Snow (2012) and The Pamplemousse (2013).

Filmography

Films

Television

References

External links

Living people
Canadian male film actors
Canadian male television actors
People from Corner Brook
Male actors from Newfoundland and Labrador
20th-century Canadian male actors
21st-century Canadian male actors
Year of birth missing (living people)